The Opiinae are a subfamily of braconid parasitoid wasps with over 1300 described species. Several species have been used in biocontrol programs against fruit flies and Agromyzidae flies. They are closely related to the Alysiinae.

Description and distribution 

Opiinae are small wasps, usually under 5mm long. They are non-cyclostomes, but sometimes have the appearance of a cyclostome opening. Unlike Alysiinae, Opiinae have endodont mandibles, which open inwards. Opiinae are found worldwide.

Biology 
Opiinae are koinobiont endoparasitoids of cyclorrhaphus Diptera. Females oviposit into host  eggs or larvae. The host is allowed to develop until it forms a puparium, at which point it is killed by the wasp larva.

References

External links 
 Photographs at BugGuide.net
 DNA barcodes at BOLD systems

Braconidae
Apocrita subfamilies